La Fox is the penultimate station on Metra's Union Pacific West Line, located in La Fox, Illinois, an unincorporated area in Kane County, Illinois. Unless otherwise announced, inbound trains use the north (island) platform and outbound trains use the south (side) platform. The northernmost track, despite being adjacent to the island platform, is used exclusively by freight trains.

As of December 5, 2022, La Fox is served by 49 trains (25 inbound, 24 outbound) on weekdays, by all 10 trains in each direction on Saturdays, and by all nine trains in each direction on Sundays and holidays. Two inbound trains originate here, and two outbound trains terminate here.

La Fox was originally served by the Chicago and North Western Railway on its main line from Chicago to Omaha, Nebraska. A station was located at the crossing of La Fox Road and the tracks, and closed in 1954.

La Fox station is located at ground level and consists of two platforms, one side, and one island. Three tracks run through the station, and all tracks are served by a platform. There is an unstaffed shelter next to the south track. La Fox has no bus connections. It is next door to the Potter and Barker Grain Elevator.

Inbound Metra trains to Chicago either use the south track or the middle track, depending on the time of day. Outbound Metra trains to Elburn use the south track. During rush hours, out-of-service Metra trains bypass the station on their way to the Elburn rail yard.

The station serves La Fox, Campton Hills, Wasco, Kaneville, and parts of Geneva, Illinois.

References

External links 

Metra stations in Illinois
Railway stations in the United States opened in 2006
Transportation buildings and structures in Kane County, Illinois
Former Chicago and North Western Railway stations
Union Pacific West Line